Mervyn Rose and Darlene Hard were the defending champions, but did not compete.

Bob Howe and Lorraine Coghlan defeated Kurt Nielsen and Althea Gibson in the final, 6–3, 13–11 to win the mixed doubles tennis title at the 1958 Wimbledon Championships.

Seeds

  Neale Fraser /  Margaret duPont (second round)
  Kurt Nielsen /  Althea Gibson (final)
  Luis Ayala /  Thelma Long (quarterfinals)
  Bob Howe /  Lorraine Coghlan (champions)

Draw

Finals

Top half

Section 1

Section 2

Section 3

Section 4

Bottom half

Section 5

Section 6

Section 7

Section 8

References

External links

X=Mixed Doubles
Wimbledon Championship by year – Mixed doubles